Marijo Šivolija-Jelica (born 29 June 1981 in Omišalj) is a Croatian amateur boxer and two-time Olympian best known to medal repeatedly in international competition at light heavyweight.

He also manages heavyweight boxer Mark de Mori.

Career
In 2003 he won a silver medal at the European Championships.

In Athens at the Olympics 2004 he was upset in the first round by Edgar Muñoz.

In 2005 he won a silver medal at the World Championships where he beat Armenian Artak Malumyan 20:10 in the semis but was defeated in the final by Kazakh Yerdos Dzhanabergenov 12:27.

At the Euros he was upset early by Frenchman Mamadou Diambang 23:27.

In 2007 at the World Championships he lost to eventual winner Abbos Atoev in the quarterfinals 6:17.

At the Olympics 2008 he lost his second match to Dzhakhon Kurbanov 1:8.

He has since become the manager of heavyweight boxer Mark de Mori.

External links
World Championships 2005

Boxers at the 2004 Summer Olympics
Boxers at the 2008 Summer Olympics
Olympic boxers of Croatia
Living people
1981 births
Sportspeople from Rijeka
Croatian male boxers
AIBA World Boxing Championships medalists
Light-heavyweight boxers
Competitors at the 2005 Mediterranean Games
Mediterranean Games medalists in boxing
Mediterranean Games bronze medalists for Croatia